is a Japanese manga series written and illustrated by Hiroyuki Murata. It was serialized in Kodansha's seinen manga magazine Weekly Young Magazine from 1989 to 2006, with its chapters collected in 50 tankōbon volumes. A sequel, Kōshoku Aika Volley Boys, was serialized in the same magazine from 2006 to 2011, with its chapters collected in 17 tankōbon volumes. It was adapted into a two-episode original video animation (OVA) in 1997, a three-episode drama video in 2006 and a live-action film in 2008.

Media

Manga
Written and illustrated by Hiroyuki Murata, Kōgyō Aika Volley Boys was serialized in Kodansha's seinen manga magazine Weekly Young Magazine from 1989 to 2006. Kodansha collected its chapters in fifty tankōbon volumes, released from July 17, 1989, to April 6, 2006.

A sequel, titled , was serialized in the same magazine from 2006 to 2011. Its chapters were collected in seventeen tankōbon volumes, released from August 4, 2006, to July 6, 2011.

Original video animation
A two-episode original video animation, animated by J.C.Staff and distributed Toho, was released in 1997.

Live-action
The series was adapted into a three-episode live-action drama video in 2006. A live-action film adaptation premiered on November 22, 2008.

Reception
The manga had over 12 million copies in circulation as of February 2021.

References

External links
 

Comedy anime and manga
Coming-of-age anime and manga
Kodansha manga
J.C.Staff
Seinen manga
Volleyball in anime and manga